Marco Balbul (born 13 July 1967) is an Israeli football manager and former player.

Early life
Balbul was born in Tirat Carmel, Israel as the youngest child of Sephardic Jewish immigrant parents who immigrated from Egypt to Israel in 1950. Aged 9, he was accepted to the youth system of Maccabi Haifa.

Playing career
Babul made his first team debut for Maccabi Haifa in 1986. Spending most of his career at the club, he won several honours including the Israeli Premier League and the Israel State Cup. 

He made his Israel national team debut against Greece in 1990. He has 5 appearance in the UEFA Euro 1996 qualifying.

Managerial career
On 28 December 2014, Balbul was appointed the new manager of Maccabi Haifa, replacing Aleksandar Stanojević who resigned from the job.

On 11 August 2022, Balbul was announced as the head coach of Indian Super League club NorthEast United. But on 8 December 2022 he was sacked after the club failed to register a single win in the league.

Honours

Player
Maccabi Haifa
 Israeli Premier League: 1988–89, 1990–91, 1993–94
 State Cup: 1991, 1993, 1995

Manager
Maccabi Haifa
 Israeli Premier League runner-up: 2018–19, 2019–20
 Toto Cup runner-up: 2014–15

References

External links

 
 
 

1967 births
Living people
Israeli Mizrahi Jews
Israeli footballers
Footballers from Tirat Carmel
Association football defenders
Israel international footballers
Liga Leumit players
Israeli Premier League players
Maccabi Haifa F.C. players
Maccabi Tel Aviv F.C. players
Israeli football managers
Hapoel Be'er Sheva F.C. managers
Bnei Sakhnin F.C. managers
Maccabi Petah Tikva F.C. managers
Maccabi Haifa F.C. managers
NorthEast United FC managers
Israeli Premier League managers
Israeli people of Egyptian-Jewish descent
Israeli Sephardi Jews
Indian Super League head coaches
Israeli expatriates in India
NorthEast United FC head coaches